The 2011 Open Castilla y León was a professional tennis tournament played on hard courts. It was the 26th edition of the tournament which was part of the Tretorn SERIE+ of the 2011 ATP Challenger Tour. It took place in Segovia, Spain between 1 and 7 August 2011.

ATP entrants

Seeds

 1 Rankings are as of July 25, 2011.

Other entrants
The following players received wildcards into the singles main draw:
  Guillermo Alcaide
  Pablo Carreño Busta
  Gerard Granollers
  Christian Voinea

The following players received entry as a special exempt into the singles main draw:
  Henri Kontinen
  Fabrice Martin

The following players received entry from the qualifying draw:
  Jaime Pulgar-García
  Nikola Mektić
  Adrián Menéndez
  Federico Zeballos

The following players received entry as a lucky loser into the singles main draw:
  Albano Olivetti

Champions

Singles

 Karol Beck def.  Grégoire Burquier, 6–4, 7–6(7–4)

Doubles

 Johan Brunström /  Frederik Nielsen def.  Nicolas Mahut /  Lovro Zovko, 6–2, 3–6, [10–6]

External links
Official Website
ITF Search 
ATP official site